Mohammed Kahn/Khan or John Ammahaie was an American soldier in the American Civil War, who was enlisted as a private in the 43rd New York Infantry and fought at the Battle of Gettysburg. He was born in Persia (modern Iran) and raised in Afghanistan.

Kahn was admitted to the United States in 1861 and resided with his family in Boston, Massachusetts. On August 2, 1861, he enlisted in the Union Army after encouragement from some friends. 

Besides his injury at Battle of the Wilderness, he was wounded again at the Battle of Malvern Hill; gain at Spotsylvania Courthouse, Virginia; and yet again  at the Battle of Monocacy in Frederick, Virginia. According to official records, he was first admitted to the District of Columbia General Hospital in Washington, D.C. In May 1864 he was transported to Philadelphia, where he received treatment at the Chestnut Hill Hospital, and in July of that year at nearby Mower General Hospital.

Kahn spent the rest of the war as a sharpshooter, and applied for an army pension which was approved in 1881. He was one of a small number of Muslims who had served in the American Civil War, and is known primarily from his pension application which is housed at the National Archives and Records Administration. His pension case made it to the U.S. Congress in 1884.

See also
Josiah Harlan
11th Pennsylvania Cavalry Regiment
 Persians
 Iranian Americans
Afghan Americans

References

Union Army soldiers
Iranian emigrants to the United States
Afghan emigrants to the United States